Linhares Esporte Clube, commonly known as Linhares, was a Brazilian football team from Linhares, Espírito Santo. They competed once in the Série C and four times in the Copa do Brasil.

History
Linhares Esporte Clube were founded on March 15, 1991, after a failed attempt to merge Industrial Esporte Clube and América Futebol Clube de Linhares. After the merger failed, Industrial folded and were founded again as Linhares Esporte Clube.

Linhares won the Campeonato Capixaba for the first time in 1995. The club competed in the Série C in 1995, and reached the Copa do Brasil semifinals in 1994, when they were eliminated by Ceará. They competed again in 1996, in 1998 and in 1999.

The club were relegated to the Campeonato Capixaba Second Division in 2002, then, after a financial crisis, the club folded in 2003.

Stadium
The club played their home games at the Guilherme Augusto de Carvalho stadium. The stadium had a maximum capacity of 12,000 people.

Presidents
List of presidents:
 Ademilson Nunes Loureiro (1991)
 José Viguini (1992)
 José Armando Maciel (1993)
 Cirilo Pandini (1994)
 Titi Conti (1995)
 Ademilson Nunes Loureiro (1996—1997)
 Edson Ferreira de Paula (1998—1999)
 Cirilo Pandini (1999)

Achievements
 Campeonato Capixaba:
 Winners (4): 1993, 1995, 1997, 1998

References

Defunct football clubs in Espírito Santo
Association football clubs established in 1991
Association football clubs disestablished in 2003
1991 establishments in Brazil
2003 disestablishments in Brazil